Journey to Happiness (German: Fahrt ins Glück) is a 1948 German romantic drama film directed by Erich Engel and starring Käthe Dorsch, Rudolf Forster and Hildegard Knef. It was made at the Babelsberg Studios in Berlin while location shooting took place around the Attersee (lake) in Austria.The film's sets were designed by the art director Erich Kettelhut.  It was one of a significant number of films produced during Nazi Germany but not released until after the fall of the Nazi regime. It was originally made in 1944 during the Second World War, but its release was delayed by four years before it eventually premiered in the Soviet Zone.

Cast
 Käthe Dorsch as Celia Loevengaard
 Rudolf Forster as Konsul Hoyermann
 Hildegard Knef as Susanne Loevengaard
 Werner Fuetterer as Richard Jürgens
 Hedwig Wangel as Großmutter Loevengaard
 Ruth Nimbach as Lisette, Hausmädchen
 Max Eckard as 	Fred, Artist
 Gustav Knuth as 	Holm, Antiquitätenhändler
 Erich Fiedler as Varietebesucher
 Hans Stiebner as Varietebesucher
 Karl Hannemann as 	Gläubiger bei Loevengaards 
 Heinrich Troxbömker as Gläubiger bei Loevengaards
 Helmuth Helsig as Schlafwagenschaffner
 Victor Janson as 	Varietiedirektor
 Maria Loja as Artist
 Hellmuth Passarge as Chauffeur

References

Bibliography
 Rentschler, Eric. The Ministry of Illusion: Nazi Cinema and Its Afterlife. Harvard University Press, 1996.
 Trimborn, Jürgen. Hildegard Knef: das Glück kennt nur Minuten : die Biographie''. Deutsche Verlags-Anstalt, 2005.

External links 
 

1948 films
1948 drama films
German drama films
East German films
1940s German-language films
Films directed by Erich Engel
UFA GmbH films
German black-and-white films
1940s German films
Films of Nazi Germany
Films shot in Austria
Films shot at Babelsberg Studios

de:Fahrt ins Glück